The Grave Monument from Kallithea is a tomb of a family of metics from Histria (Nikeratos and his son Polyxenos), which was excavated in Kallithea (Athens, Greece). The monument itself dates back to around 320 BCE and contains a polychrome frieze. It is currently located at the Piraeus Archaeological Museum. This grave monument was built outside the Long Walls leading to Piraeus.

Description 

The grave monument is composed of a limestone podium, which supports a marble pedestal with steps. On top of that, there are three statues inside an Ionic naiskos (a small temple). The three statues inside are of a family. The one on the far left is of Nikeratos, who wears a himation. The center statue is of his son, Polyxenos, who is depicted as a naked athlete in the contrapposto pose. The statue on the right is of one of the family's slave boys. The father and the slave boy and both in a static pose. All three have the softened musculature indicative of the Hellenistic period. The monument has noticeably aged. Limestone, a softer rock, has caused the podium to lose a few large chunks due to weathering. The marble pedestal has a few large cracks and a couple small missing pieces. The main frieze was done in relief. It depicts an Amazonomachy, where Greeks fought the tribe of warrior women. There is a blank area between two sections of the relief frieze, which may have been a painted frieze that has faded away with time. The naiskos is in a rather poor condition as all three statues inside have had their heads fall off.

Comparison to contemporaries 
This grave monument is fairly reflective of others in the late 4th century BCE. It depicts conspicuous consumption, as only the wealthy could afford something this extravagant. In 317/316 BCE, grave monuments were banned under Demetrios of Phaleron's anti-luxury decree. Conspicuous monuments such as this one may have been the impetus behind the passage of the law.

Gallery

References

External link 

Ancient Greek buildings and structures in Athens
Burial monuments and structures in Greece
Kallithea
4th-century BC works